Damiris Dantas do Amaral (born November 17, 1992) is a Brazilian basketball player for the Minnesota Lynx of the Women's National Basketball Association (WNBA).

Together with the junior Brazilian team, she won the bronze medal at the Under-19 World Championship in 2011, Chile, and was named Most Valuable Player at that tournament. That same year, Dantas was also champion of the 2011 FIBA Americas Championship for Women with the senior national team, and won a bronze medal at the 2011 Pan American Games.

Dantas began to play basketball at Janeth Arcain's basketball institute at the age of 13. Within four years, she had become a professional.

Dantas played for Ourinhos in 2012, Maranhão in 2013, and has been in Americana since 2013.

WNBA

Minnesota Lynx (2014-2015)
Dantas was drafted by the Minnesota Lynx in the First Round of the 2012 WNBA Draft - 12th Overall. Dantas was not expected to play in the WNBA until after the 2012 Olympic Games.

She was signed by the Lynx on April 2, 2014. Dantas made her WNBA debut on May 16, 2014, gathering 12 rebounds in a win against Washington. Dantas became the second rookie in league history to debut with 10 rebounds and 5 assists. With Rebekkah Brunson being sidelined with tendinitis, Dantas became the starter, and soon led the WNBA rookies in rebounds.
On August 9, 2015, she made 18 points.

Atlanta Dream (2015 & 2017)
On July 27, 2015, Dantas was traded to the Atlanta Dream as part of the three-team deal. She was suspended for the 2016 WNBA season after she failed to report to training camp, instead using the time to train with the Brazilian National team for the 2016 Summer Olympics that the country would host in Rio de Janeiro.  Atlanta retained Dantas's rights and they expected her to play with the team during the 2017 season.

Minnesota Lynx (2019-Present)
On February 8, 2019, Dantas signed with the Minnesota Lynx as a free agent. Dantas missed several games in 2019 due to a calf injury. She continued to expand her game and make herself valuable for the Lynx as she improved her outside shooting to open up the inside play for Sylvia Fowles.

Dantas showed up in 2020 for the Lynx as they played in the WNBA Bubble. Over the 22-game campaign, Dantas shot 44.3% from three-point on just over four attempts beyond the arc per game, cementing her spot as one of the WNBA's elite-shooting bigs. She finished the season with averages of 12.9 points, 6.1 rebounds, and 2.6 assists per game. Dantas and the Lynx agreed to a multi-year extension in September 2020 after she completed one of her best years in the WNBA. Coach Cheryl Reeve stated that, “Damiris has been such an important part of the Lynx culture since she first became a member of our organization in 2014...She has made great strides as a player over the last couple of years and remains an important element in our path forward.”

WNBA career statistics

Regular season

|- style="text-align: Center;"
| style="text-align:left;"| 2014
| style="text-align:left;"| Minnesota
| 30 || 23 || 21.8 || .511 || 1.000 || .760 || 5.1 || 1.2 || 0.5 || 0.3 || 0.8 || 6.0
|- style="text-align: Center;"
| style="text-align:left;"| 2015
| style="text-align:left;"| Minnesota
| 16 || 4 || 16.7 || .581 || .667 || .789 || 3.3 || 1.2 || 0.2 || 0.3 || 1.1 || 5.6
|- style="text-align: Center;"
| style="text-align:left;"| 2015
| style="text-align:left;"| Atlanta
| 16 || 16 || 24.8 || .383 || .333 || .973 || 5.4 || 0.7 || 0.9 || 0.6 || 1.1 || 8.3
|- style="text-align: Center;"
| style="text-align:left;"| 2017
| style="text-align:left;"| Atlanta
| 34 || 2 || 18.0 || .392 || .265 || .767 || 3.6 || 0.7 || 0.5 || 0.5 || 0.8 || 7.7
|- style="text-align: Center;"
| style="text-align:left;"| 2018
| style="text-align:left;"| Atlanta
| 19 || 0 || 13.4 || .433 || .238 || .722 || 2.4 || 0.8 || 0.4 || 0.0 || 0.5 || 5.4
|- style="text-align: Center;"
| style="text-align:left;"| 2019
| style="text-align:left;"| Minnesota
| 26 || 26 || 25.6 || .432 || .393 || .731 || 4.5 || 3.2 || 0.7 || 0.5 || 1.7 || 9.2
|- style="text-align: Center;"
| style="text-align:left;"| 2020
| style="text-align:left;"| Minnesota
| 22 || 22 || 26.6 || .464 || .433 || .727 || 6.1 || 2.6 || 1.1 || 0.2 || 1.8 || 12.9
|- style="text-align: Center;"
| style="text-align:left;"| 2021
| style="text-align:left;"| Minnesota
| 24 || 20 || 23.8 || .377 || .333 || .650 || 4.0 || 2.3 || 0.4 || 0.3 || 1.8 || 7.7
|- style="text-align: Center;"
| style="text-align:left;"| 2022
| style="text-align:left;"| Minnesota
| 15 || 15 || 17.5 || .304 || .262 || .833 || 3.8 || 1.9 || 0.2 || 0.1 || 1.1 || 5.1
|- style="text-align: Center;"
| align="left" | Career
| align="left" |8 years, 2 teams
| 202 || 128 || 21.2 || .425 || .341 || .781 || 4.3 || 1.6 || 0.6 || 0.4 || 1.2 || 7.7

Postseason

|- style="text-align: Center;"
| style="text-align:left;"| 2014
| style="text-align:left;"| Minnesota
| 3 || 0 || 8.4 || .500 || .000 || 0.000 || 0.7 || 0.3 || 0.0 || 0.0 || 0.3 || 0.7
|- style="text-align: Center;"
| style="text-align:left;"| 2019
| style="text-align:left;"| Minnesota
| 1 || 1 || 28.0 || .615 || .333 || 1.000 || 6.0 || 1.0 || 2.0 || 0.0 || 5.0 || 20.0
|- style="text-align: Center;"
| style="text-align:left;"| 2020
| style="text-align:left;"| Minnesota
| 4 || 4 || 34.3 || .471 || .519 || .833 || 7.5 || 2.8 || 1.5 || 0.0 || 2.5 || 18.0
|-
|- style="text-align: Center;"
| align="left" | Career
| align="left" |3 years, 1 team
| 8 || 5 || 23.8 || .500 || .485 || .857 || 4.8 || 1.6 || 1.0 || 0.0 || 2.0 || 11.8

References

External links

1992 births
Living people
Atlanta Dream players
Basketball players at the 2011 Pan American Games
Basketball players at the 2012 Summer Olympics
Basketball players at the 2016 Summer Olympics
Brazilian expatriate basketball people in Spain
Brazilian expatriate basketball people in the United States
Brazilian women's basketball players
Centers (basketball)
Medalists at the 2011 Pan American Games
Minnesota Lynx draft picks
Minnesota Lynx players
Olympic basketball players of Brazil
Pan American Games bronze medalists for Brazil
Pan American Games medalists in basketball
Sportspeople from São Paulo (state)
People from Ferraz de Vasconcelos